Dalman is a surname. Notable people with the surname include:

Albert Gustaf Dahlman (1848–1920), born Albert Gustaf Dalman, Swedish executioner
Cecilia Dalman Eek (born 1960), Swedish politician
Chris Dalman (born 1970), former professional American football player
Drew Dalman (born 1998), American football player
Elizabeth Cameron Dalman (born 1934), Australian choreographer
Gustaf Dalman (1855–1941), German Lutheran theologian and orientalist
Johan Dalman (born 1960), Swedish Lutheran bishop
Johan Wilhelm Dalman (1787–1828), Swedish physician and a naturalist
Joseph Dalman (1882–1944),  German screenwriter
Mehmet Dalman, British-Turkish Cypriot investment banker
Olle Dalman (1922–2007), Swedish alpine skier

See also
Jose Dalman, Zamboanga del Norte, 4th class municipality in the province of Zamboanga del Norte, Philippines

English-language surnames
German-language surnames
Turkish-language surnames